Jelizaveta Žuková or Elizaveta Valeriyevna Zhuk (born 2 November 2003) is a former Russian-Czech pair skater who competes for the Czech Republic. With her skating partner, Martin Bidař, she is a two-time Czech national champion (2020–2021) and represented the Czech Republic at the 2022 Winter Olympics.

Personal life 
Elizaveta Zhuk was born on 2 November 2003 in Yekaterinburg, Russia. In December 2021, she became a Czech citizen. Her name changed to Jelizaveta Žuková, with a feminine suffix added to the Czech transliteration of her Russian name.

Career

Early career 
Zhuk began learning to skate in 2007. Training in pairs, early partners included Maxim Miroshkin and Evgeniy Kostarev. She competed with Egor Britkov for three seasons, placing fourth at the 2017 Russian Junior Championships and winning a silver medal at the 2017 CS Golden Spin of Zagreb the following season.

2019–2020 season 
On June 26, 2019, Zhuk announced a new partnership with Czech pair skater Martin Bidař, with plans to represent his country. They competed exclusively domestically in their first season together, winning the Czech national title.

2020–2021 season 
With the COVID-19 pandemic limiting international opportunities, Zhuk/Bidař made their debut internationally at the 2020 CS Nebelhorn Trophy, one of only four pairs on the preliminary entry list. They were fifth in the short, fourth in the free, and fourth overall.  They subsequently competed at the 2021 World Championships, placing fifteenth and, in the process, qualifying for a berth for a Czech pair at the 2022 Winter Olympics.

2021–2022 season 
In September, the Czech federation officially named Zhuk/Bidař to the Czech Olympic team. They made their debut at the 2021 CS Finlandia Trophy, where they placed ninth. They later competed at a second Challenger event, finishing twelfth at the 2021 CS Warsaw Cup.

Zhuk opted to restyle her name as Jelizaveta Žuková in advance of the Olympics. Žuková/Bidař made their European Championships debut in Tallinn, finishing in twelfth place. 

Žuková/Bidař began the 2022 Winter Olympics as the Czech entries in the pairs' short program Olympic team event, where they placed eighth of nine, earning three points for the Czech team. Team Czech Republic did not advance to the next stage of the competition and finished eighth overall. With two falls in the short program of the pairs event, they finished seventeenth and were the first team to miss qualification for the free skate. Žuková sustained an ankle injury in training, as a result of which they did not compete at the 2022 World Championships.

In March 2022, Žuková liked an Instagram post by Evgeni Plushenko expressing support for the 2022 Russian invasion of Ukraine. The president of the Czech Figure Skating Association noted that the federation strongly disagreed with her position and distanced itself. The president explained to Žuková the unsuitability of her conduct and asked her to apologize for her decision. Žuková apologized, stating that her decision was due to "youthful recklessness" and "misreading and misunderstanding" the post; the president deemed the apology sufficient.

2022–2023 season 
Žuková/Bidař were eighth at the 2022 CS Nebelhorn Trophy to start the season before placing sixth at the 2022 Skate Canada International.

Programs

With Bidař

With Britkov

Competitive highlights 
CS: Challenger Series

With Bidař for the Czech Republic

With Britkov for Russia

Detailed results 
ISU Personal Best highlighted in bold.

 With Bidař

References

External links 
 
 
 

2003 births
Living people
Czech female pair skaters
Russian female pair skaters
Sportspeople from Yekaterinburg
Naturalized citizens of the Czech Republic
Russian emigrants to the Czech Republic
Figure skaters at the 2022 Winter Olympics
Olympic figure skaters of the Czech Republic